Oscar George Kindlund (born January 11, 1997) is a Swedish professional footballer who plays as a midfielder for Nybergsund IL-Trysil, on loan from IK Sirius.

His father, Björn Kindlund, is a former professional football player who has played for AIK.

Career 
Kindlund's mother club is IK Sirius. He debuted for the first-team on 15 June 2012 against Akropolis IF.

In summer 2013, Kindlund went to IFK Göteborg. In 2015 he signed a professional contract and won the U19-Allsvenskan with the club. In June 2016 Kindlund was loaned to IK Sirius. He debuted in the Superettan on June 11, 2016 against GAIS (0–0). On August 5, 2016, IK Sirius announced that Oscar Kindlund had signed a three-year contract with the club.

References

External links 
 
 Oscar Kindlund at Fotbolltransfers.com
  (archive)

1997 births
Living people
Association football midfielders
IK Sirius Fotboll players
IFK Göteborg players
Swedish footballers
Allsvenskan players
Superettan players